The McLaren Artura is a hybrid sports car designed and manufactured by the British car manufacturer McLaren Automotive, scheduled to enter production from 2021.

Overview
The name of the second hybrid McLaren and the first McLaren with a V6 engine was announced on 23 November 2020.
It is a combination of the words ‘art’ and ‘future’.

It inaugurates a new carbon fiber chassis called MCLA (McLaren Carbon Lightweight Architecture).

Specifications

Engine
The all-aluminum engine has a bank angle of 120 degrees, a world first for a production V6 engine. This is to accommodate a hot-vee layout, where the two turbochargers are placed in the vee of the engine. Power is sent to the rear wheels through an all-new 8 speed dual-clutch transmission. Redline is at 8,500 rpm.

Electric motor
The combined torque peak is less than the sum of both sides as the output is limited to "optimize powertrain drivability characteristics". The  lithium-ion battery pack weighs  and is positioned under the rear of the passenger compartment. McLaren claims a 2.5-hour time for an 80 percent charge using an EVSE cable and a  electric range under European testing methodology. This motor replaces the reverse gear, similar to the Ferrari SF90 Stradale.

Performance

References

External links 

 Official website

Artura
Coupés
Hybrid electric cars
Sports cars
Rear mid-engine, rear-wheel-drive vehicles
Cars introduced in 2021
2020s cars